The 1852 United States presidential election in Delaware took place on November 2, 1852, as part of the 1852 United States presidential election. Voters chose three representatives, or electors to the Electoral College, who voted for President and Vice President.

Delaware voted for the Democratic candidate, Franklin Pierce, over Whig candidate Winfield Scott. Pierce won Delaware by a very narrow margin of 0.19%, only 25 votes.

Results

See also 
 United States presidential elections in Delaware

References

Delaware
1852
1852 Delaware elections